Yemenite Songs is a 1984 album by Ofra Haza, in which the Israeli pop star returned to her roots interpreting traditional Yemeni Jewish songs with lyrics coming from the poetry of 16th century Rabbi Shalom Shabazi. The album was recorded with both traditional and modern musical instruments; wooden and metal percussion, Yemenite tin and tambala, strings, brass and woodwind as well as drum machines and synthesizers.
The songs are sung in Hebrew with a Yemenite accent and in Arabic.

In US, the album was released under the title Fifty Gates of Wisdom (Yemenite Songs), having a slightly different track order.

Composition 
The opening song "Im Nin' Alu"'s a cappella intro would eventually become the starting point of Haza's international career as it was sampled by a number of European and American rap and dance acts like Eric B. & Rakim on their "Paid In Full" and M|A|R|R|S on "Pump Up the Volume" which led to Haza releasing a dance remix of her own recording in 1988 (subtitled Played In Full) which became a pop chart hit in many parts of the world. Remixes of both "Im Nin' Alu" and "Galbi" were included on the first international album Shaday.

Track listing
Side A:
"Im Nin'alu"  (Shabazi) - 5:18
"Yachilvi Veyachali" (Shabazi) - 3:27
"A 'Salk" (Shabazi, Traditional) - 4:45
"Tzur Mentati"/"Se'i Yona"/"Sapri Tama" (Ben-Amram, Shabazi, Traditional) - 5:44

Side B: 
"Galbi" (Amram, Shabazi)  4:14
"Ode Le-Eli" (Shabazi, Traditional) - 3:31
"Lefelach Harimon" (Shabazi, Traditional)  5:08
"Ayelet Chen" (Shabazi) - 6:30

Personnel
 Ofra Haza - lead vocals
 Benny Nagari - arranger, conductor, music producer
 Lesli Lishinski, Marvin Feinshmit - bassoon
 Ilan School - clarinet, bass clarinet
 Eli Magen - double bass
 Iki Levy - drums, congas, metal and wooden percussion, timbales
 Abigail Erenheim, Benny Nagari - flute, piccolo
 Shlomo Shochat - French horn
 Meril Grinberg, Herman Openstein - oboe, English horn
 Chaim Gispan - percussion (Yemenite tin & tambala)
 Strings: Avraham Rosenblatt, Elchanan Bregman, Israel Berkowitch, Israela Wisser, Rima Kaminkowski, Yigal Tuneh, Yitzchak Markowetzki, Yuval Kaminkowski

Production
 Bezalel Aloni - record producer
 Benny Nagari - music producer/arranger
 Yoav Gera - Audio recording and mixing
 Recorded at Triton Studios, Tel Aviv between August and September 1984.
 Aharon Amram - artistic advisor

References

1984 albums
Ofra Haza albums
Yemeni music